Lieutenant-General Sir Charles William Maxwell  (1775 – 23 September 1848, Broadstairs) was a British soldier and colonial administrator.

He was the eldest son of Charles Maxwell of Terraughty, Dumfriesshire and his third wife, Helen Douglas.

He joined the British Army in 1796. He was knighted in 1836 and was appointed Lieutenant General in 1841.  He was appointed Colonel of the 3rd West India Regiment in 1843.

Cape Mesurado raid
Cape Mesurado was being used as a base for the slave trade and in 1815 Maxwell, then Governor of Sierra Leone, sent an armed force to raid the settlement, seizing ships, merchandise and enslaved Africans from the factories there. The factory owners were sentenced to fourteen years' transportation to New South Wales by the vice admiralty court.

References

1775 births
1848 deaths
British Army generals